Savignac is the name of several communes in France:

 Savignac, Aveyron, in the Aveyron department
 Savignac, Gironde, in the Gironde department

Also, the monastic order:

 Congregation of Savigny